The Town Is Quiet is a 2000 French drama film directed by Robert Guédiguian.

Cast 
 Ariane Ascaride - Michèle
 Jean-Pierre Darroussin - Paul
 Gérard Meylan - Gérard
 Jacques Boudet - Paul's Father 
 Christine Brücher - Viviane Froment
 Jacques Pieiller - Yves Froment
 Pascale Roberts - Paul's Mother 
 Julie-Marie Parmentier - Fiona
 Pierre Banderet - Claude

References

External links 

2000 drama films
2000 films
European Film Awards winners (films)
French drama films
Films directed by Robert Guédiguian
2000s French films